Ego Trippin'  is the ninth studio album by American rapper Snoop Dogg. It was released on March 11, 2008 by Doggystyle Records, Interscope Records and Geffen Records. The album debuted at number 3 on the US Billboard 200, selling 137,000 copies in its first week. Upon its release, the album received generally positive reviews from music critics.

Background 
The album was originally set to feature no guests and showcase Snoop Dogg only, hence the title "Ego Trippin'". However, Snoop Dogg proved this concept untrue as he scheduled tracks with the likes of Charlie Wilson, among others. All of the photography was taken at Long Beach Polytechnic High School, Snoop's high school. Snoop Dogg also went on to admit he used ghostwriters for this album, such as American rapper Problem, among others.

Snoop Dogg originally confirmed that Pharrell, Nelly and Charlie Wilson would appear on a track entitled "Feet Don't Fail Me Now", and that he also would like to work with Bono, Madonna and Mick Jagger as well. However, "Feet Don't Fail Me Now" and none of the collaborations would make the final album cut except for Charlie Wilson's features. Collaborations with DJ Quik, Raphael Saadiq, Teddy Riley and Too Short were also scheduled for the album. Snoop Dogg formed a production supergroup for the album called "QDT" (Quik-Dogg-Teddy).

Snoop Dogg spoke on working with Everlast for a country song called "Johnny Cash". However, the track's title was changed to "My Medicine" with Everlast playing the guitar. Another track with Charlie Wilson and The Gap Band called "Can't Say Goodbye" was also confirmed for the album. Snoop Dogg reminisced on the track stating, "This song makes me want to cry every time I hear it. It is a reflection of my life and how I have grown as not only an artist but also a man - it is about me staying true to where I came from while having to accept where I am in my life today, it's deep".

Snoop Dogg and Charlie Wilson both performed 'Can't Say Goodbye' on American Idol'''s 'Idol Gives Back' Charity Performance. On July 29, 2008 BET's 106 & Park premiered Snoop Dogg's video for "Those Gurlz".

Track 2, "Press Play" was featured in the video game Midnight Club: Los Angeles.

Critical reception Rolling Stone said, "[H]is languorous rapping has a way of inspiring inventively freaky sounds from producers... Result: the best Snoop disc in years."Entertainment Weekly said, "All of Snoop's personalities make appearances on his ninth CD, Ego Trippin'....It's sentimental, it's fun... Maybe this old Dogg doesn't need any new tricks." Vibe said, "Lead single 'Sensual Seduction' is an undeniable masterpiece of throwback funk."

 Commercial performance 
The album debuted at number three on the US Billboard 200 chart, selling 137,000 copies in its first week.  In its second week the album fell to number seven on the Billboard 200 chart, selling 57,000 copies, for a two-week total of 194,000 copies. Ego Trippin was the tenth best selling hip hop album of the year. As of 2011, the album has sold 401,000 copies in the United States.

 Track listing 
Information is based on the album's Liner Notes

	Notes'''
"A Word Witchya!" samples "Distant Lover" performed by Marvin Gaye
"Press Play" samples "Voyage to Atlantis" performed by The Isley Brothers
"Cool" is a cover of The Time's song "Cool"
"Sets Up" samples "Hola' Hovito" performed by Jay-Z
"Deez Hollywood Nights" samples "Hollywood Knights" performed by Brooklyn Dreams
"My Medicine" samples the traditional nursery rhyme "Jack Be Nimble"
"Those Girls" samples "Too Much Heaven" performed by The Bee Gees
"One Chance (Make it Good)" samples "Make It Good" performed by Prince Philip Mitchell
"Why Did You Leave Me" samples "Celtic Rain" performed by Mike Oldfield
"Can't Say Goodbye" samples "The Way It Is" performed by Bruce Hornsby & The Range
"Walk Away" samples "Down Rodeo" performed by Rage Against the Machine

Personnel 
Credits adapted from the album's Liner Notes and Allmusic.

 Snoop Dogg – vocals (5-7, 10, 13, 16-17, 20, lead on (1-4, 8-9, 11-12, 14-15, 18-19, 21), background vocals (15)
 J. Black – background vocals (14)
 Mike Bozzi – mastering assistant
 Chuck Brungardt – engineer
 Chilly Chil - vocals (20)
 Ted Chung – A&R
 Marcus Coleman – producer
 Erick "Baby Jesus" Coomes – bass guitar (18)
 Aaron Dahl – assistant engineer
 Larrance Dopson  – keyboards (5)
 Scott Elgin – engineer
 Ron Fair – arranger (6)
 Whitey Ford – producer
 Jamie Foxx – additional lead vocals (4)
 Latonya "Tone Treasure" Givens - background vocals (2, 12, 14)
 Andrew Gouche - bass guitar (1)
 Daniel Groover - guitar (20)
 Tescia Harris - background vocals (4)
 John Hart - upright bass (16)
 Tasha Hayward – hair stylist
 Mike Hogue – assistant engineer
 Erika Jerry – background vocals (9)
 Brian Kennedy - keyboards (20)
 Justin Kirk - trombone (2)
 Kurupt – additional lead vocals (2)
 Lady G - background vocals (3)
 Trevor Lawrence Jr. – drums (16)
 Terrace Martin - vocals (5, background on 15), additional music arranger (1-2, 7, 11-12, 17, 19), grand piano (19), keyboards (1, 8, 11-12, 14, 17), synthesizer (5), alto sax (2, 5), percussion (1, 12)

 Andrew Mezzi – mixing assistant
 Mistah F.A.B. – vocals (7)
 Peter Mokran – mixing
 Richard Niles – engineer
 Bobby Ozuna - drums, percussion (8)
 Neil Pogue – mixing
 Omar Reyna – engineer
 Teddy Riley - background vocals (3-4, 15)
 April Roomet – stylist
 Raphael Saadiq – guitar, bass guitar, Hammond organ, vocals (8)
 Fareed Salamah – assistant
 Alexis Seton – mixing assistant
 Corey Stocker – engineer
 James Tanksley – assistant engineer, engineer
 Too Short – vocals (7)
 Uncle Chucc - vocals (5, background on 9), bass guitar (5, 17)
 Javier Valverde – assistant
 Franklin Rivers Vasquez – engineer
 Liam Ward – layout design
 Kamasi Washington – tenor sax (2)
 Calthomeesh West - background vocals (2, 15)
 Whitey Ford – guitar (16)
 Marlon Williams – guitar (1, 5, 11, 19)
 Meelah Williams – background vocals (9)
 Pharrell Williams - additional vocals (10)
 Charlie Wilson – additional lead vocals (3, 21)
 Brandon Winbush - additional vocals (18)
 Dante Winslow - trumpet (2)
 Dave Young – background vocals (8)

Charts

Weekly charts

Year-end charts

Certifications

Release history

References

External links 

2008 albums
Snoop Dogg albums
Albums produced by DJ Quik
Albums produced by Hit-Boy
Albums produced by Polow da Don
Albums produced by Rick Rock
Albums produced by Raphael Saadiq
Albums produced by Scoop DeVille
Albums produced by Shawty Redd
Albums produced by Terrace Martin
Albums produced by Teddy Riley
Albums produced by the Neptunes
Geffen Records albums